The Mothers 1970 is a 4-CD box set celebrating the 50th anniversary of the short-lived 1970 line-up of Rock-band The Mothers. It compiles 70 unreleased tracks recorded during this era of the band.

Content 
The album contains three discs of previously unreleased material, The first disc features studio recordings from Trident Studios that would adventually evolve into Chunga's Revenge. These studio recordings were engineered by a then-unknown Roy Thomas Baker who would go on to be the producer for many famous bands such as Queen, The Cars, and Alice Cooper among others. The remaining three discs contain live concerts from this era, The first two discs contains the first official release of the bootlegged "Piknik" live broadcast as well as live concerts in Santa Monica, California, and Spokane, Washington. Due to not being entirely recorded these concerts were put together in a hybrid concert. The third disc consists of live highlights that were recorded throughout the US occasionally broken up with candid moments recorded in dressing rooms, motel lobbies, and on stage. These were recorded by Frank Zappa who took his UHER recorder everywhere. All of these recordings were sourced from there original vault tapes and digitally compiled and transferred by Joe Travers in 2020.

Reception 
Writing for Loudersound, Hugh Fielder liked the album. He states that the first disc is "somewhat tentative" and states how the live discs show that this band line-up is far better than the only album this line-up released, Chunga's Revenge. He also states that the live concerts show the band moving towards what would eventually become 200 Motels.

Track listing

Personnel 

 Jeff Simmons - bass, vocals
 Frank Zappa - guitar, vocals, composer
 Aynsley Dunbar - drums
 Ian Underwood - organ, keyboards, guitar
 George Duke - piano, keyboards, trombone
 Flo & Eddie - vocals, percussion

References 

2020 compilation albums
Frank Zappa compilation albums